Kossa may refer to:

István Kossa (1904–1965), Hungarian politician
Moussa Koussa (born 1949?), Libyan politician and diplomat
Kossa Bokchan (1925–2009), Serbian painter
Kossa F.C., Solomon Islands football club
Von Kossa stain, method used in cell biology